Ramiro Pruneda [PRU-ned-ah] (born 25 January 1983) is a Mexican offensive tackle for the Dinos de Saltillo of the Liga de Fútbol Americano Profesional (LFA).  He was signed by the Cologne Centurions in 2006. He played college football at ITESM.

Pruneda was also a member of the Kansas City Chiefs, Philadelphia Eagles, New York Sentinels and Green Bay Blizzard.

Early years
He started his football career at High School No. 2 in Monterrey, Mexico.

College career
The Monterrey, Mexico native was part of the Borregos Salvajes Monterrey team that claimed four National Championships and was named the country’s Best Offensive Lineman three times by the ONEFA (Mexican counterpart to the NCAA). Pruneda was a five-time selection to the Mexico National Team, playing in the Aztec Bowl against an NCAA Division III all-star team.

Professional career

Cologne Centurions
He attended training camp with NFL Europe in 2006 as a national player. He quit football and became a professor at Louisiana State University.

Green Bay Blizzard
After two years of professional football inactivity, he was signed with Indoor Football League (IFL) team Green Bay Blizzard, being promoted to offensive lineman starter.

Mayas CDMX
In 2016 he signed for Raptors Naucalpan of the newly created Mexican LFA, but an injury left him out of the fields for a year. In 2017 he signed for Mayas CDMX and he was part of the team that won the 2017 Tazón Mexico (Mexico Bowl). He was part of the Mayas roster for the 2018 and 2019 seasons.

Pioneros de Querétaro
On 26 October 2019, Pruneda signed with Pioneros de Querétaro ahead of the 2020 LFA season.

Dinos de Saltillo
In February 2022 Pruneda signed with Dinos de Saltillo.

References 

1983 births
Living people
Sportspeople from Monterrey
Mexican players of American football
American football offensive tackles
Cologne Centurions (NFL Europe) players
Kansas City Chiefs players
Philadelphia Eagles players
San Francisco 49ers players
New York Sentinels players
Green Bay Blizzard players
Mayas CDMX players
Pioneros de Querétaro players
Dinos de Saltillo players
Borregos Salvajes Monterrey players
Expatriate players of American football
Mexican expatriate sportspeople in Germany
Mexican expatriate sportspeople in the United States